Seilkopf Peaks is a group of mainly ice-free peaks and ridges between Portalen Pass and Nalegga Ridge in the Borg Massif, Queen Maud Land. The feature was photograph air by the German Antarctic Expedition (1938–39) and named for Heinrich Seilkopf, head of the marine aerology section of the Deutsche Seewarte (German Hydrographic Office) in Hamburg. Although rudely mapped by German Antarctic Expedition, the Seilkopf Peaks are clearly shown and identified in air photos published by the expedition. The peaks were mapped in detail by the Norwegian-British-Swedish Antarctic Expedition (NBSAE) (1949–52).

References

External links

Mountains of Queen Maud Land
Princess Martha Coast